Nathalie Timmermans (born July 21, 1989 in Oldenzaal, Overijssel) is a Dutch softball player, who represents the Dutch national team in international competitions.

Timmermans played for Run '71 Oldenzaal, Tex Town Tigers and since 2008 for Sparks Haarlem. She is a catcher and third baseman who bats and throws right-handed. She has competed for the Dutch national team since 2007, the year she was named the best batter of the Dutch Softball Hoofdklasse. She was part of the Dutch team for the 2008 Summer Olympics in Beijing.

External links
 Timmermans at dutchsoftballteam.com

References

1989 births
Living people
People from Oldenzaal
Dutch softball players
Olympic softball players of the Netherlands
Softball players at the 2008 Summer Olympics
Sportspeople from Overijssel